John Ive may refer to:

John Ive (died 1409), MP for New Romney
John Ive (MP for Midhurst), represented Midhurst in 1402 and 1415

See also
John Ives, antiquarian
Jonathan Ive, designer at Apple Inc.